Ronald Dale Kittle (born January 5, 1958) is an American former left fielder and designated hitter in Major League Baseball (MLB). He was known for his home run hitting power, and was named the 1983 AL Rookie of the Year. Kittle played for the Chicago White Sox (1982–86, 1989, 1991), New York Yankees (1986–87), Cleveland Indians (1988) and Baltimore Orioles (1990). He batted and threw right-handed. Kittle was also a manager for the minor league Schaumburg Flyers.

Career
A former steelworker who made his MLB debut at nearly 25 years old, Kittle was a popular player on the 1983 "winning ugly" Chicago White Sox when they won 99 games and made their first playoff appearance since the 1959 World Series. That season, Kittle was selected an All-Star and won Rookie of the Year honors after hitting 35 home runs (club record for a rookie) and 100 RBI.

Kittle also hit 50 homers in the minor leagues with the Edmonton Trappers and has his jersey retired in Edmonton at Telus Field. He was voted winner of 1982's Pacific Coast League Most Valuable Player Award.
 
Kittle maintained his home run power, but after 1983 his batting average declined and his strikeouts increased. Kittle left the White Sox after 1986 and played part of 1986 and all of 1987 with the New York Yankees. Kittle then played 1988 with the Indians. He briefly returned again to the White Sox in 1990, sharing playing time at first base with Carlos Martínez. He batted .245 with 16 homers and 43 RBI but struck out 77 times in 277 at-bats through the first four months of that season.

Kittle was acquired by the Baltimore Orioles from the White Sox for Phil Bradley on July 30, 1990. He was resentful of the trade which brought forth the possibility of Frank Thomas being promoted from the minors. In need of a right-handed power hitter, the Orioles received a player with a $550,000 salary as opposed to the $1.15 million that Bradley was earning. Baltimore general manager Roland Hemond was criticized by the Daily Press for bringing on too many ex-White Sox like Kittle, Greg Walker, Kevin Hickey, Tim Hulett and Dave Gallagher. He became a free agent again in the off-season when the Orioles, who had earlier signed Dwight Evans, elected not to exercise the option on his contract on December 15, 1990.

Kittle appeared in 843 games over the course of his 10–year MLB career. He recorded 176 home runs and 460 runs batted in.

Managerial career 
In 1998, Kittle was hired as the first manager of the non-affiliated minor league Schaumburg Flyers of the Northern League. During the early years of the Flyers franchise, Kittle did a series of TV commercials to promote the team, using the gimmick "Ma Kittle," where he played both himself and his "Ma Kittle." The ads were successful at sparking some initial interest in the team as the Flyers hoped to steal away fans from the nearby Kane County Cougars, then a Florida Marlins Class A team. The ad mimicked the highly successful Converse ads where Larry Johnson starred as both himself and "Grandmama." Kittle resigned his position in 2001.

Personal life
Kittle was married from 1984 until 2010 and has two children.

Kittle's memoirs, Ron Kittle's Tales from the White Sox Dugout, was published in 2005. Co-written with Bob Logan, who also co-wrote Michael Jordan's book Come Fly with Me, the book features anecdotes from Kittle's time as a major leaguer, mostly with the White Sox.

Kittle builds custom collectible benches out of baseballs, bats and bases. He also works in public relations for the White Sox.

References

External links

Ron Kittle's website
Ron Kittle's Celebrity Annual Golf Outing website 

1958 births
Living people
American expatriate baseball players in Canada
American League All-Stars
Appleton Foxes players
Baltimore Orioles players
Baseball players from Gary, Indiana
Buffalo Bisons (minor league) players
Chicago White Sox players
Cleveland Indians players
Columbus Clippers players
Clinton Dodgers players
Edmonton Trappers players
Glens Falls White Sox players
Knoxville Sox players
Lethbridge Dodgers players
Major League Baseball designated hitters
Major League Baseball left fielders
Major League Baseball Rookie of the Year Award winners
New York Yankees players
Northern League (baseball, 1993–2010) managers
People from Chesterton, Indiana
People from Valparaiso, Indiana
Pacific Coast League MVP award winners
Vancouver Canadians players